KCNA (102.7 MHz, "102.7 The Drive") is a commercial classic hits music FM radio station in Cave Junction, Oregon, broadcasting to the Medford-Ashland, Oregon area. The station is currently owned by Opus Broadcasting Systems.

Translators and booster
KCNA broadcasts on the following translators and booster:

References

External links
Official Website

Classic hits radio stations in the United States
Cave Junction, Oregon
CNA
Radio stations established in 1981
1981 establishments in Oregon